The Arizona International Film Festival is the oldest and longest running independent film festival in Arizona. Taking place yearly, film programs include a mix of shorts, children's films, feature-length films, documentaries and animation films.  The festival is also a Film Festival Grant Recipient of The Academy of Motion Picture Arts and Sciences.

References

External links
 

Film festivals in Arizona
Festivals in Tucson, Arizona